Tamlaght Finlagan Monastery was an early religious settlement in Tamlaght Finlagan, Ballykelly, County Londonderry, Northern Ireland.

The monastery was founded in 585 AD. The name of the monastery means "The plague monument of St. Findluganus". Findluganus was an associate of St. Columba, who attended the Drumceatt Synod of 574 AD.  The abbey became a parish church and is mentioned in some papal paperwork in 1291. However, by 1622 the church was in ruins, which can still be seen today.

References

Roman Catholic monasteries in Northern Ireland
Plague monuments and memorials